Antimitrella is a genus of sea snails, marine gastropod mollusks in the family Columbellidae, the dove snails.

Species
Species within the genus Antimitrella include:
 Antimitrella adela (Thiele, 1925)
 Antimitrella amphitrite (Turton, 1932)
 Antimitrella apicibulbus (Tomlin, 1920)
 Antimitrella fuscafasciata (Lussi, 2009)
 Antimitrella jaci Lussi, 2009
 Antimitrella kincaidi (Tomlin, 1926)
 Antimitrella lamellosa Lussi, 2009
 Antimitrella laxa Powell, 1937
 Antimitrella nereia (Turton, 1932)
 Antimitrella perexilis (Turton, 1932)

References

Columbellidae